The Punjab Lalit Kala Akademi is Punjab's state academy of fine arts. It's an autonomous cultural organisation established and funded by the Government of Punjab to preserve and publicize the fine art and culture outside the state. Punjab Lalit Kala Akademi uplifts the study and research in field of paintings, sculptures, mixed-media art and photography.


History
Punjab Lalit Kala Akademi was founded in 1966. The Akademi was set up by the Government of Punjab to promote the associations and development of such collaborative efforts among the artists of Punjab state. Dr. M. S. Randhawa who was founder chief Administrator of Chandigarh (Union Territory) worked hard to develop art centre of Punjab and he founded Punjab Lalit Kala Akademi, Sangeet Natak Akademi and Sahitya Akademi. Dr. Randhawa also built Punjab Arts Council, Chandigarh Museum and Museum of Cultural Heritage of Punjab at Ludhiana at the same time.

In the year 1980 Akademi got recognition in the entire Northern India and for the first time Akademi organised the exhibition of Photography and Sculpture, Akademi also announced to grant awards of Rs. 13,500/- with certification to the participants. Akademi purchased the works from the artists displayed at the exhibitions in Chandigarh and sponsored an exhibition of All India Fine Arts and Crafts Society

Art gallery
Punjab Lalit Kala Akademi Gallery is located in the building.

Publications
It has also decided to foster the publications on art literature including monographs, journals, art- albums etc. An art library was also established and equipped with books and journals on Indian and International art with intention to provide assets for future generations. Akademi also decided to honour the artists, art historians and art critics for their contribution and achievements in the development field of art. PLKA published its first art book on contemporary artists of Punjab, in which critic works of Raj Jain, Shiv Singh, Malkit Singh, Jagdish Ahuja was featured. Later book was translated into Punjabi by K S Kang

References

External links
 

Punjab, India-related lists
Schools in Punjab, India